Archineura hetaerinoides
Archineura incarnata
Caliphaea confusa
Caliphaea consimilis
Caliphaea thailandica
Calopteryx aequabilis
Calopteryx amata
Calopteryx angustipennis
Calopteryx atrata
Calopteryx balcanica
Calopteryx coomani
Calopteryx cornelia
Calopteryx dimidiata
Calopteryx exul
Calopteryx haemorrhoidalis
Calopteryx hyalina
Calopteryx intermedia
Calopteryx japonica
Calopteryx laosica
Calopteryx maculata
Calopteryx maracandica
Calopteryx melli
Calopteryx mingrelica
Calopteryx oberthuri
Calopteryx orientalis
Calopteryx samarcandica
Calopteryx splendens
Calopteryx syriaca
Calopteryx taurica
Calopteryx transcaspica
Calopteryx unicolor
Calopteryx virgo
Calopteryx waterstoni
Calopteryx xanthostoma
Echo margarita
Echo maxima
Echo modesta
Echo uniformis
Hetaerina amazonica
Hetaerina americana
Hetaerina auripennis
Hetaerina aurora
Hetaerina brightwelli
Hetaerina caja
Hetaerina capitalis
Hetaerina charca
Hetaerina cruentata
Hetaerina curvicauda
Hetaerina duplex
Hetaerina erythrokalamus
Hetaerina flavipennis
Hetaerina fuscoguttata
Hetaerina gallardi
Hetaerina hebe
Hetaerina indeprensa
Hetaerina infecta
Hetaerina laesa
Hetaerina longipes
Hetaerina majuscula
Hetaerina medinai
Hetaerina mendezi
Hetaerina miniata
Hetaerina moribunda
Hetaerina mortua
Hetaerina occisa
Hetaerina pilula
Hetaerina proxima
Hetaerina rosea
Hetaerina rudis
Hetaerina sanguinea
Hetaerina sempronia
Hetaerina simplex
Hetaerina titia
Hetaerina vulnerata
Hetaerina westfalli
Iridictyon myersi
Iridictyon trebbaui
Matrona basilaris
Matrona cyanoptera
Matrona taoi
Mnais andersoni
Mnais gregoryi
Mnais incolor
Mnais maclachlani
Mnais mneme
Mnais nawai
Mnais pruinosa
Mnais semiopaca
Mnais tenuis
Mnesarete aenea
Mnesarete astrape
Mnesarete borchgravii
Mnesarete cupraea
Mnesarete devillei
Mnesarete fulgida
Mnesarete fuscibasis
Mnesarete globifer
Mnesarete grisea
Mnesarete guttifera
Mnesarete hauxwelli
Mnesarete hyalina
Mnesarete imperatrix
Mnesarete marginata
Mnesarete mariana
Mnesarete metallica
Mnesarete pruinosa
Mnesarete pudica
Mnesarete regina
Mnesarete rollinati
Mnesarete saltuum
Mnesarete smaragdina
Neurobasis anderssoni
Neurobasis anumariae
Neurobasis australis
Neurobasis chinensis
Neurobasis cyaneipennis
Neurobasis daviesi
Neurobasis ianthinipennis
Neurobasis kaupi
Neurobasis kimminsi
Neurobasis longipes
Neurobasis luzoniensis
Noguchiphaea yoshikoae
Phaon camerunensis
Phaon iridipennis
Psolodesmus mandarinus
Sapho bicolor
Sapho ciliata
Sapho fumosa
Sapho gloriosa
Sapho orichalcea
Sapho puella
Umma cincta
Umma declivium
Umma distincta
Umma electa
Umma femina
Umma infumosa
Umma longistigma
Umma mesostigma
Umma mesumbei
Umma purpurea
Umma saphirina
Vestalis amabilis
Vestalis amaryllis
Vestalis amethystina
Vestalis amnicola
Vestalis amoena
Vestalis anacolosa
Vestalis anne
Vestalis apicalis
Vestalis atropha
Vestalis beryllae
Vestalis gracilis
Vestalis luctuosa
Vestalis lugens
Vestalis melania
Vestalis miao
Vestalis smaragdina
Vestalis yunosukei

References

 ; ;  2011: Descriptions of Matrona oreades spec. nov. and Matrona corephaea spec. nov. from China (Odonata: Calopterygidae).  Zootaxa, 2830: 20–28. Preview
 ;  2011: Matrona taoi spec. nov., a new damselfly species from northern Vietnam (Odonata: Calopterygidae). Zootaxa, 2927: 63–68.  Preview erratum in  Zootaxa, 2970: 68. PDF

 List of 
Lists of insects